Cody Michael Payne Scarpetta (born August 25, 1988) is a former minor league baseball pitcher. A second-generation minor league pitcher, he is the son of Dan Scarpetta (Brewers, Rangers, and Dodgers) and the nephew of Dennis Scarpetta (Phillies). His cousin Brett was drafted by the White Sox (18th rd 2005) and the Braves (38th round, 2006) but did not sign.

Scarpetta was drafted by the Milwaukee Brewers in the 11th round of the 2007 amateur entry draft out of Guilford High School, signing him away from Creighton University on a $125,000 signing bonus. His original contract was voided, however, when it was discovered he needed surgery on his finger. He was signed to a new, one-year minor league contract, and could've become a minor league free agent after his first year, but that option was eliminated when the Brewers placed him on their roster, also protecting him from the Rule V Draft.

In 2008, he split the season between the Rookie league Arizona Brewers and Helena Brewers, going 2-0 in 12 appearances (8 starts) with a 2.23 ERA, striking out 58 in 36.1 innings. He pitched 2009 with Single-A Wisconsin, where in 26 appearances (18 starts), he went 4-11 with a 3.43 ERA, striking out 116 in 105 innings. He was promoted to High-A Brevard County, where in 27 starts, he went 7-12 with a 3.87 ERA, striking out 142 in 128 innings. After the season, he was named the 4th best prospect in the Brewers organization by Baseball America. Scarpetta began 2011 with Double-A Huntsville, where in 23 starts, he went 8-5 with a 3.85 ERA, striking out 98 in 117 innings.

He was called up to the majors on July 10, 2011, but did not pitch, and was sent down the next day. After the season, he played with the Peoria Javelinas of the Arizona Fall League, and he struggled, going 0-3 in 4 starts with a 19.64 ERA. He was named the 7th best prospect in the Brewers organization by Baseball America. Tommy John reconstructive elbow surgery kept him from playing in the 2012 season. He returned to baseball on June 2, 2013 with Brevard County. In 11 starts he went 0-5 with a 7.15 ERA and 36 walks in 34 innings. Scarpetta was released from the Brewers on December 21, 2013.

Scarpetta began 2014 with the independent Atlantic League's Lancaster Barnstormers, where he made 8 starts, going 0-3 with a 5.13 ERA, striking out 37 in 40.1 innings before being picked up by the Atlanta Braves on June 12, 2014. He was assigned to High-A Lynchburg.

He was released by the York Revolution on May 28, 2016, and signed with the St. Paul Saints of the American Association later that same day.

References

External links

MiLB.com player profile

1988 births
Living people
Arizona League Brewers players
Helena Brewers players
Huntsville Stars players
Wisconsin Timber Rattlers players
Brevard County Manatees players
Lynchburg Hillcats players
Lancaster Barnstormers players
Baseball players from Illinois
West Oahu Canefires players
Peoria Javelinas players